James Leo Schuster (1912–2006) was the long-serving 6th bishop of St John's in what was then known as Kaffraria and is now Mthatha. Educated at Lancing College and Keble College, Oxford, he was ordained in  1937.  Assistant missioner at Rotherhithe until 1938, he was subsequently chaplain at St Stephen's House, Oxford, and then served in the Second World War as a chaplain to the Forces. In 1949 he was appointed principal of St Bede's College, Umtata, before his ordination to the episcopate in 1956. In retirement he was archdeacon of Riversdale.  He died after a long retirement in 2006.

Notes 

1912 births
People educated at Lancing College
Alumni of Keble College, Oxford
Anglican bishops of St John's
20th-century Anglican Church of Southern Africa bishops
Anglican archdeacons in Africa
2006 deaths
World War II chaplains
Royal Army Chaplains' Department officers